A dog clutch (also known as a positive clutch or dog gears) is a type of clutch that couples two rotating shafts or other rotating components by engagement of interlocking teeth or dogs rather than by friction. The two parts of the clutch are designed such that one will push the other, causing both to rotate at the same speed and will never slip. In engineering, a "dog" is a tool or device used to lock two components in relation to each other.

Dog clutches are used where slip is undesirable and/or the clutch is not used to control torque. Without slippage, dog clutches are not affected by wear in the same way that friction clutches are, but result in shock when shafts of different speeds are engaged. For this reason they are best used when sudden starting action is acceptable and the inertia of the system is small.

Dog clutches are used inside constant-mesh manual transmissions to lock different gears to the rotating input and output shafts. A synchromesh arrangement ensures smooth engagement by matching the shaft speeds before the dog clutch is allowed to engage. Racecar, motorcycle, and large truck transmissions, having less need for smooth engagement than passenger cars and higher performance demands, commonly employ dog clutches alone (without the use of synchronizers) to engage gears due to their high strength and durability and low complexity and weight. These unsynchronized gearboxes, also referred to as a dog boxes, allow clutchless shifting.

Another example of a dog clutch is in the Sturmey-Archer bicycle hub gear, where a sliding cross-shaped clutch locks the driver assembly to different parts of the planetary geartrain.

References

Clutches